Bai Lang or Bailang may refer to:

 Chang An-lo (born 1948), a.k.a. Bai Lang (White Wolf), a Taiwanese gangster
 Bai Lang Rebellion (1911–1914), rebellion against Yuan Shikai
 Pai-lang language, or Bailang, earliest recorded Tibeto-Burman language
 Bailang County, Tibet Autonomous Region, China
 Bailang, Zixing, a town of Zixing City, Hunan